Setiawan is an Indonesian surname. Notable people with the surname include:
 Ade Iwan Setiawan (born 1984), Indonesian footballer 
 Ady Setiawan (born 1994), Indonesian footballer
 Andi Setiawan (born 1984), Indonesian footballer
 Arif Setiawan (born 1996), Indonesian footballer
 Dedik Setiawan (born 1994), Indonesian footballer
 Denny Setiawan (born 1980), Indonesian badminton player 
 Dwika Tjahja Setiawan (born 1966), commodore in the Indonesian Navy
 Eka Febri Yogi Setiawan (born 2000), Indonesian footballer
 Erik Setiawan (born 1983), Indonesian former footballer
 Fredy Setiawan (born 1991), Indonesian para badminton player
 Hari Setiawan (born 1970), Indonesian weightlifter
 Hendra Setiawan (born 1984), Indonesian badminton player
 Heri Setiawan (born 1987), Indonesian-born Bahraini male badminton player
 Indra Setiawan (born 1990), Indonesian footballer
 Leo Setiawan, Indonesian heavy metal musician
 Loudry Setiawan (born 1991), Indonesian former footballer
 Mariska Setiawan (born 1990), Indonesian soprano
 Modestus Setiawan (born 1982), Indonesian footballer
 Novri Setiawan (born 1993), Indonesian footballer
 Rosad Setiawan (born 1996), Indonesian footballer
 Rudi Setiawan (born 1993), Indonesian semi-professional footballer
 Soni Setiawan (born 1993), Indonesian footballer
 Teddy Heri Setiawan (born 1991), Indonesian footballer

Indonesian-language surnames
Surnames of Indonesian origin